Anybody Out There? is a 2007  novel by Marian Keyes.

It is about Anna Walsh, a woman who is recovering from an injury whilst in her parents' residence in Dublin, Ireland, and is reminiscing about the life she once lived in New York. Anna is married to Aidan and had worked in public relations for a cosmetics firm in East Village.

Catherine Sevigny of The Observer stated that it was a "vivid portrait of a recovery". Emma Hagestadt of The Independent described it as "Reminiscent of the 1990 feel-good movie Ghost".

References

2007 Irish novels
Chick lit novels
Novels set in Dublin (city)